Coleophora unigenella is a moth of the family Coleophoridae. It is found in Fennoscandia, northern Russia and the Alps.

The larvae feed on Dryas octopetala. They create a yellowish brown spatulate leaf case, cut out of the margin of the leaf. The case is 5–7 mm long and the mouth angle is about 45°. The youth case differs from the later case only in size. Larvae are found at the underside of the leaves. Larvae can be found from autumn to spring. They continue feeding after hibernation.

References

unigenella
Moths of Europe
Moths described in 1966